Don't Look Down is a 2008  Argentine fantasy drama film directed and written by Eliseo Subiela. Don’t Look Down portrays a young man in mourning who takes to sleep-walking, falls into a girl’s bed through her skylight, and accepts her literally transporting lessons in intimacy.

Plot
19-year-old Eloy works with his parents in the family business, assigning tombstones and ornamental figures at burials in the city cemetery. After his father's death, Eloy is forced to grow up quickly, in a world he finds hostile and alien. One day he meets Elvira, a young Andalusian girl, who introduces him to sexual practices that will lead him to uncover unknown areas of his spirit and reality. Elvira invites Eloy to become her lover and teaches him Tantric sex. Eloy discovers bliss.

Cast
 Antonella Costa as Elvira
 Leandro Stivelman as Eloy
 Hugo Arana as Padre de Eloy
 Mónica Galán as Ana

Reception
Dan Fainaru of Screen Daily wrote that "Most audiences will probably go along for the ride mainly for the piquant stuff on the menu, though they are ultimately bound to be as sceptical about the higher concepts of it all as Elroy's brother is when he's told about the 'magical' experiences of his sibling."

References

External links
 

2008 films
2000s Spanish-language films
2000s fantasy drama films
Argentine fantasy drama films
2000 drama films
2000 films
2000s Argentine films
2010s Argentine films